The Soul Market is a 1916 American silent drama film directed by Francis J. Grandon. The film is considered to be lost.

Plot
Olga Petrova plays Elaine Elton, a famous actress who is engaged to a powerful producer. She meets a millionaire, who poses as a chauffeur to conquer her because he knows she dislikes rich men. She falls in love with him but cannot accept his proposal of marriage because of her engagement to the producer.

Cast
 Olga Petrova as Elaine Elton (credited as Olya Petrova)
 Arthur Hoops as Oscar Billings
 John Merkyl as Jack Dexter (credited as Wilmuth Merkyl)
 Fritz De Lint as Dick Gordon
 Evelyn Brent as Vivian Austin
 Fraunie Fraunholz as Griggs
 Charles Brandt as Sam Franklin
 Charles Mack as Harvey Theugh
 Bert Tuey as Joe Burrows
 Grace Florence as Mrs. Wilson
 Cora Milholland as Susan
 Al Thomas as James Austin
 Gypsy O'Brien as Billie Simpson
 Claire Lillian Barry

References

External links

1916 films
1916 drama films
Silent American drama films
American silent feature films
American black-and-white films
Films directed by Francis J. Grandon
Lost American films
Metro Pictures films
1916 lost films
Lost drama films
1910s American films